Jackson Bidei (born 10 October 1957) is a Nigerian former wrestler. He competed in the men's freestyle 100 kg at the 1988 Summer Olympics.

References

External links
 

1957 births
Living people
Nigerian male sport wrestlers
Olympic wrestlers of Nigeria
Wrestlers at the 1988 Summer Olympics
Place of birth missing (living people)
Commonwealth Games medallists in wrestling
Commonwealth Games silver medallists for Nigeria
Wrestlers at the 1994 Commonwealth Games
20th-century Nigerian people
21st-century Nigerian people
Medallists at the 1994 Commonwealth Games